Katherine Rednall (born 7 January 1996) is an English lawn and indoor bowler from Stowmarket. She is record five times women's world indoor singles champion.

Bowls career

Indoors
Rednall became the youngest ever winner of a World Indoor Bowls title after she won the 2014 World Indoor Bowls Championship Women's Singles at the age of just 18. Rednall reached the final of the 2015 World Indoor Bowls Championship losing out to Laura Thomas in the decider. Rednall experienced further success after winning the Mixed Pairs title in 2016 with bowls partner Darren Burnett.

She won a second singles title in 2017 after defeating Ellen Falkner in the final  and a third singles title during the 2018 World Indoor Bowls Championship defeating Rebecca Field in the final.

During the 2021 World Indoor Bowls Championship she was seven months pregnant and performed well reaching the women's final, the mixed pairs semi final and was also the first woman to reach the Open singles quarter final. The following year during the 2022 World Indoor Bowls Championship, she won a record breaking fourth singles title.

At the 2023 World Indoor Bowls Championship, Rednall won her fifth women's singles to extend her record, she fought back after losing the first set to defeat Ceri Ann Glen in the tie break set.

Outdoors
She was selected as part of the English team for the 2018 Commonwealth Games on the Gold Coast in Queensland where she won a bronze medal in the Triples with Ellen Falkner and Sian Honnor. In 2019, she won two bronze medals at the European Bowls Championships.

In 2020 she was selected for the 2020 World Outdoor Bowls Championship in Australia.

Personal life
Rednall is the daughter of England international John Rednall. She studied for a degree in fashion and textiles at the University of Essex and enjoys playing the saxophone.

References

English female bowls players
Living people
1996 births
People from Stowmarket
Indoor Bowls World Champions
Commonwealth Games bronze medallists for England
Commonwealth Games medallists in lawn bowls
Bowls players at the 2018 Commonwealth Games
Medallists at the 2018 Commonwealth Games